Namitete is a town located in the Central Region district of Lilongwe in Malawi.

Populated places in Central Region, Malawi